"Who You Are" is a song by American rock band Pearl Jam. Featuring lyrics written by vocalist Eddie Vedder and music co-written by drummer Jack Irons and guitarist Stone Gossard, "Who You Are" was released on July 30, 1996, as the first single from the band's fourth studio album, No Code (1996). The song topped the US Billboard Modern Rock Tracks chart and the Canadian Alternative 30 chart. It also peaked at number 31 on the Billboard Hot 100, number two on the UK Rock Chart, and reached the top 10 in Australia, Canada, Norway, and Finland—where the song reached number two and became the band's highest-charting single.

The song was included on Pearl Jam's 2004 greatest hits album, Rearviewmirror (Greatest Hits 1991–2003). On Pearl Jam's greatest hits album, "Who You Are" has a slight lyric change. Instead of "circumstance, clapping hands", it's "avalanche, falling fast".

Origin and recording
"Who You Are" features lyrics written by vocalist Eddie Vedder and music co-written by drummer Jack Irons and guitarist Stone Gossard. The polyrhythmic drum pattern for the song was inspired by a Max Roach drum solo that Irons heard at a drum shop when he was eight years old. Irons said, "To turn my drum music into a song is pretty challenging, but the guys have been really supportive of me doing it, and we've worked some things into a few songs." Vedder played an electric sitar on the song, giving it an Eastern-influenced sound. Regarding the song, Vedder said, "We realized that we had an opportunity to experiment."

Release and reception
Vedder has admitted that the choice of "Who You Are" as the first single for No Code was a "conscious decision" intended to keep the size of the band's audience down. The single, containing the B-side "Habit" across most regions, was released in the United States on July 30, 1996. In the US, "Who You Are" peaked at number 31 on the Billboard Hot 100, number five on the Billboard Mainstream Rock Tracks chart, and number one on the Billboard Modern Rock Tracks chart. In Canada, the song reached number four on the RPM 100 chart and later appeared on the Alternative 30 chart, where it reached number one; it came in at number 17 on that chart's year-end issue.

Released in the United Kingdom on August 5, 1996, "Who You Are" reached the UK top 20, peaking at number 18 on the UK Singles Chart. Elsewhere, the single peaked at number five on the Australian Singles Chart, charted at number 26 in Sweden, and became a top-10 success in Norway and Finland; it is Pearl Jam's highest-charting single in the latter country, peaking at number two. The song was also a top-20 success in Ireland and New Zealand.

David Fricke of Rolling Stone said that the song has an "Indo-Bo Diddley glow" and called it a "buoyant electric variation on Vedder's recent collaborations with Pakistani vocal god Nusrat Fateh Ali Khan." Christopher John Farley of Time also identified an influence of Vedder's collaboration with Nusrat Fateh Ali Khan, stating, "The spiritualized, bass-heavy "Who You Are" is a solid number, but it clearly owes a lot to Pakistani singer Nusrat Fateh Ali Khan, with whom Pearl Jam frontman Eddie Vedder worked on the sound track to the film Dead Man Walking." Vedder denied that his collaboration with Nusrat Fateh Ali Khan had any influence on the song.

Live performances
"Who You Are" was first performed live at the band's September 14, 1996, concert in Seattle, Washington at The Showbox. Following Irons' departure from the band in 1998 the song was dropped from set lists. After the band's March 9, 1998 concert in Sydney, Australia at the Sydney Entertainment Centre, the song was not performed live for a period of ten years. "Who You Are" finally made a return appearance at the band's June 11, 2008, concert in West Palm Beach, Florida at the Cruzan Amphitheatre. The song has since returned to Pearl Jam set lists. Live performances of "Who You Are" can be found on various official bootlegs.

Charts

Weekly charts

Year-end charts

Release history

See also
 Number one modern rock hits of 1996
 List of RPM Rock/Alternative number-one singles

References

External links
 
 Lyrics at pearljam.com

1996 singles
1996 songs
Epic Records singles
Pearl Jam songs
Song recordings produced by Brendan O'Brien (record producer)
Song recordings produced by Eddie Vedder
Song recordings produced by Jack Irons
Song recordings produced by Jeff Ament
Song recordings produced by Mike McCready
Song recordings produced by Stone Gossard
Songs written by Eddie Vedder
Songs written by Jack Irons
Songs written by Stone Gossard